Eureka is a rural settlement in the Waikato District and Waikato region of New Zealand's North Island. It is located on State Highway 26, and is surrounded by dairy farmland on a flat plain.

There are various explanations for the name. One story suggests William Steele rode out with a syndicate looking for a headquarters, and exclaimed "Eureka I have found it" when he reached the hilltop. Another story suggests "Eureka" is an abbreviation of the first names of the women in the syndicate.

The settlement has a war memorial, listing local men who died in World War I and World War II.

History 
Eureka is on the former Piako Swamp, described in 1876 as deep. Following the invasion of the Waikato, it was part of the area confiscated from Ngāti Hauā in 1864. Captain William Steele, who brought militia-settlers from Sydney to Hamilton in 1864, persuaded Thomas Russell and Frederick Whitaker to form a company to buy land and drain it. In 1874 the government sold the  Eureka Estate, extending from Te Hoe to Tauwhare, Tamahere, Gordonton and the  confiscation line, to New Zealand Loan and Mercantile Agency Company Limited. The sale required  of road to be built over the swamp. The expense of drainage contributed to bankruptcy and the sale of small parcels in 1902. The population then increased, so that a school was built in May 1904, a dairy factory in 1905, a hall in 1914 (replaced in January 1969), a post office opened in 1915, a store in 1925 and a garage in 1928. However, by 1981 all the early buildings had gone.

Demographics 
Eureka is in three SA1 statistical area which cover . The SA1 areas are part of the larger Eureka-Tauwhare statistical area.

The SA1 areas had a population of 573 at the 2018 New Zealand census, an increase of 69 people (13.7%) since the 2013 census, and an increase of 120 people (26.5%) since the 2006 census. There were 195 households, comprising 291 males and 282 females, giving a sex ratio of 1.03 males per female, with 123 people (21.5%) aged under 15 years, 87 (15.2%) aged 15 to 29, 300 (52.4%) aged 30 to 64, and 60 (10.5%) aged 65 or older.

Ethnicities were 90.6% European/Pākehā, 6.3% Māori, 0.5% Pacific peoples, 5.2% Asian, and 2.6% other ethnicities. People may identify with more than one ethnicity.

Although some people chose not to answer the census's question about religious affiliation, 56.5% had no religion, 31.9% were Christian, 1.0% were Buddhist and 2.1% had other religions.

Of those at least 15 years old, 105 (23.3%) people had a bachelor's or higher degree, and 66 (14.7%) people had no formal qualifications. 105 people (23.3%) earned over $70,000 compared to 17.2% nationally. The employment status of those at least 15 was that 276 (61.3%) people were employed full-time, 75 (16.7%) were part-time, and 9 (2.0%) were unemployed.

Eureka-Tauwhare statistical area

Eureka-Tauwhare had a population of 2,142 at the 2018 New Zealand census, an increase of 225 people (11.7%) since the 2013 census, and an increase of 603 people (39.2%) since the 2006 census. There were 696 households, comprising 1,092 males and 1,050 females, giving a sex ratio of 1.04 males per female. The median age was 37.5 years (compared with 37.4 years nationally), with 534 people (24.9%) aged under 15 years, 351 (16.4%) aged 15 to 29, 1,041 (48.6%) aged 30 to 64, and 213 (9.9%) aged 65 or older.

Ethnicities were 89.4% European/Pākehā, 9.5% Māori, 1.5% Pacific peoples, 5.3% Asian, and 1.8% other ethnicities. People may identify with more than one ethnicity.

The percentage of people born overseas was 16.1, compared with 27.1% nationally.

Although some people chose not to answer the census's question about religious affiliation, 56.7% had no religion, 32.1% were Christian, 0.1% had Māori religious beliefs, 0.3% were Hindu, 0.3% were Muslim, 0.7% were Buddhist and 2.8% had other religions.

Of those at least 15 years old, 408 (25.4%) people had a bachelor's or higher degree, and 225 (14.0%) people had no formal qualifications. The median income was $44,500, compared with $31,800 nationally. 411 people (25.6%) earned over $70,000 compared to 17.2% nationally. The employment status of those at least 15 was that 960 (59.7%) people were employed full-time, 273 (17.0%) were part-time, and 39 (2.4%) were unemployed.

Railway station 
It opened on 1 October 1884, when the  Eureka contract from Hamilton to Morrinsville was completed. The contract had been signed on 5 December 1883.

Eureka had a 4th class station, erected by the Auckland contractors, Price and Malcolm, with a station master's house, 2 cottages,  by  goods shed, cattle and sheep pens, loading bank, urinals and a passing loop for 38 wagons (extended to 61 by 1911), for £4,827.

There seems to have been some confusion about the goods shed and station building. In 1885 the Public Works Department reported that they moved the goods shed and 4th class station from Eureka to Hukutaia, yet, in 1886, the Railways Department reported that PWD had, without notification, moved the station building to Te Aroha. In 1896 there was just a shelter shed.

Eureka closed to passengers on 11 September 1967 and to goods on 27 April 1980. A hut, an equipment shed and a passing loop remain at the station site.

References

External links 

 Photo of Eureka Dairy Factory in 1905

Waikato District
Populated places in Waikato